The Lungs Tour was the first major headlining concert tour by English indie rock band Florence and the Machine, in support of their debut album, Lungs. In July 2009, upon the release of their debut album, Florence and the Machine announced a six-date concert tour of the United Kingdom. Six soon became nine as three more dates (one in Glasgow, one in Bournemouth and two more for London's Shepherd's Bush Empire) were added. Following the success of the UK tour, with most tickets selling out, mainland European dates were added in countries such as the Netherlands and Italy, where the album also achieved moderate success. The tour is also going to North America and a one-off show in Tokyo. In an interview with Nick Grimshaw, Florence mentioned that her tour was going to be brought to Australia. They also supported U2 on their U2 360° Tour in 2011.
After the continued success of Lungs and its new UK chart peak of number 1, Florence Welch announced another nine-date UK and Ireland tour, entitled 'The Cosmic Love Tour'. Florence and The Machine's official website held an exclusive fan pre-sale event on 27 January 2010 and tickets were fully released on Friday, 29 January at 9 a.m. All tickets, for all dates officially sold out.

Florence's costumes were designed by Gucci during the later parts of the tour.

Setlist

Support acts
 Golden Silvers (22 May 2009)
 The xx (17–29 September 2009)
 Parallels (1 November 2009)
 Voicst (Hamburg, Cologne, Berlin, Vienna, Munich and Zurich)
 Frankie & The Heartstrings (6–14 December 2009)
 The Temper Trap (6–14 December 2009)
 Sian Alice Group (20 February – 16 March 2010)
 Holy Hail (15–17 April 2010)
 Babe Shadow (5–15 May 2010)
 The Drums (5 May – 29 July 2010)
 The Naked and Famous (29 July 2010)

Tour dates

References

2009 concert tours
2010 concert tours
2011 concert tours
Florence and the Machine concert tours